This is the list of governors of Maranhão.

Military Regime

New Republic

References

Maranhao
!